State Trunk Highway 155 (often called Highway 155, STH-155 or WIS 155) is a  state highway in Villas County, Wisconsin, United States, that runs north–south from Wisconsin Highway 70 (WIS 70) St. Germain to the northern of two junctions with County Trunk Highway N (CTH‑N) Sayner. The highway is maintained by the Wisconsin Department of Transportation.

Route description
WIS 155 begins at a junction with WIS 70 in the community of St. Germain. From here, the highway heads north through a forested region with many lakes; the route lies entirely within the Northern Highland-American Legion State Forest. The route passes through the Town of St. Germain to the east of Big St. Germain Lake before curving to the northwest to bypass Lost Lake. After crossing a small creek, the highway turns west toward a junction with County Highway C. WIS 155 turns north at the junction and continues through a populated area south of Sayner. The route curves northwest into Sayner, entering the Town of Plum Lake as it does so. The highway intersects CTH‑N in Sayner, and the two highways run concurrently through Sayner. The routes run through a mixed residential and business district, passing the Vilas County Historical Museum and the Plum Lake Library. WIS 155 ends in northern Sayner at another junction with CTH‑N, which continues to the west; Plum Lake lies to the north of the terminus.

History
Before becoming a State Trunk Highway, it was a County Trunk Highway, signed CTH‑S, running from WIS* 70 to Star Lake. In 1923/1924, the part south of Sayner was signed as WIS 72. In 1926/1927, the highway was renumbered to WIS 155. The route was unpaved and would stay that way until at least 1956.

Major intersections

See also

References

External links

155
Transportation in Vilas County, Wisconsin